Events in the year 2019 in Cambodia.

Incumbents
 Monarch: Norodom Sihamoni
 Prime Minister: Hun Sen

Events
 10 March - Prime Minister Hun Sen said that he was considering introducing capital punishment for people who rape children, but he said it would only happen after a nationwide referendum. A couple days after this announcement, Hun Sen shifted his stance.
Cambodia Bayon Airlines ceased operation

Television

10 February – I Can See Your Voice Cambodia first aired.

Sport
February to November – The football tournament 2019 Hun Sen Cup
12 to 28 July – Cambodia at the 2019 World Aquatics Championships
4 to 13 August – Cambodia at the 2019 World Athletics Championships

Deaths

4 August – Nuon Chea, politician, chief ideologist of Khmer Rouge (b. 1926).
12 September – Bou Thang, politician (b. 1931).
18 November – Norodom Buppha Devi, royal, prima ballerina, and Minister of Culture and Fine Arts (b. 1943).

References

 
2010s in Cambodia
Years of the 21st century in Cambodia
Cambodia
Cambodia